Laughing Times (Chinese: 滑稽時代) is a 1980 Hong Kong comedy film written and directed by John Woo and starring Dean Shek as the Chinese Charlie Chaplin. This is the first film produced by Cinema City, a film company established by Shek, Karl Maka and Raymond Wong.

Plot
In the postwar community, where the economy is falling and many businesses are bleak. A starving wanderer named the Chinese Charlie Chaplin meets an orphan (Wong Wai) who was used to do illegal things by bad guy Master Ting and the two become fast friends. Later Charlie also meets a poor singer, whom he develops a funny romance with, and a drunkard. Due to humiliation from Ting, the drunkard turned to drinking. Later, Ting abducts the kid and the singer, prompting Charlie and the drunkard to finally rise up with ambition and risk their lives to save the kid and the singer and eventually, Ting was unable to evade the law.

Cast
Dean Shek as Chinese Charlie Chaplin
Wong Wai as the Kid
Karl Maka as Master Ting
Wu Ma as Drunkard
Lee Chung-keung
Chic Lau
Tai San as Man wearing shades
Tsang Cho-lam as Barber Cheung
Wong Sau-man as Singer
Ho Pak-kwong as Chiu Siu-man's Father
Hoi Sang Lee as bodyguard
Fung King-man as Man eating noodle
Chiu Chi-ling as street performer
Wong Yat-fei as Man getting scalp
Sai Gwa-Pau as Man who chokes on noodles
Raymond Wong as Man eating banana
Ting Yue
Shing Wan-on
Chan Fei-lung
Luk Ying-hong
Chu Tak-wai as policeman
Ho Wan
Leung Hung

Box office
The film grossed HK$5,186,448.50 at the Hong Kong box office during its theatrical run from 24 December 1980 to 11 January 1981 in Hong Kong.

External links

Laughing Times at Hong Kong Cinemagic

1980 films
Hong Kong comedy films
1980s adventure comedy films
Films about kidnapping
1980s Cantonese-language films
Films directed by John Woo
Films shot in Hong Kong
1980 comedy films
1980s Hong Kong films